Constitución is a small town in the Salto Department of northwestern Uruguay.

Constitución is also the name of the municipality to which the town belongs.

Geography

History
On 11 July 1852 it was recognized as a "Pueblo" (village) by the Act of Ley Nº 297. On 14 July 1977 its status was elevated to "Villa" (town) by the Act of Ley Nº 14.677.

Population
In 2011 Constitución had a population of 2,762.

 
Source: Instituto Nacional de Estadística de Uruguay

References

External links
INE map of Constitución

Populated places in the Salto Department